63rd Regiment or 63rd Infantry Regiment may refer to:

 63rd (The West Suffolk) Regiment of Foot, an infantry unit of the British Army
 63rd Palamcottah Light Infantry, a unit of the British Indian Army 
 63rd Armor Regiment, a unit of the US Army
 63rd Infantry Division (United States), a unit of the US Army
 63rd Cavalry (India), a unit of the Indian Army

American Civil War
Union (Northern) Army
 63rd Illinois Volunteer Infantry Regiment
 63rd Indiana Infantry Regiment
 63rd New York Infantry
 63rd Ohio Infantry
 63rd Pennsylvania Infantry
 63rd United States Colored Infantry Regiment

Confederate (Southern) Army
 63rd Virginia Infantry